Lieutenant-Colonel Sir John Henry Lancelot Aubrey-Fletcher, 7th Baronet (22 August 1912 – 19 June 1992) was a British baronet, who played first-class cricket for Oxford and was a British Army soldier.

Born in Kensington, Aubrey-Fletcher was the eldest son of Sir Henry Lancelot Aubrey-Fletcher, 6th Baronet and his wife Mary Augusta Chilton.

He was educated at Eton College and at New College, Oxford. While at Oxford in 1933 he played cricket for the university team. In 1937 he was accepted at Inner Temple entitled to practice as Barrister-at-Law. He played Minor counties cricket between 1931 and 1948 for Buckinghamshire.

In 1939 he married Diana Mary Fynvola Egerton (the great-granddaughter of the second Baron Harlech) and they had two children:
Susan Mary Fynvola Aubrey-Fletcher (1940–1976), who was married, without issue, to Hon. Richard Stanley, brother and heir presumptive of the Earl of Derby
Henry Egerton Aubrey-Fletcher, born 1945

During the Second World War he fought in the Grenadier Guards, attaining the rank of lieutenant colonel.

From 1961 to 1962 he held the office of High Sheriff of Buckinghamshire. He died in 1992 at Oxford.

References

1912 births
1992 deaths
Military personnel from London
Sportspeople from Kensington
People from Buckinghamshire
Alumni of New College, Oxford
Baronets in the Baronetage of Great Britain
British Army personnel of World War II
Grenadier Guards officers
High Sheriffs of Buckinghamshire
Members of the Inner Temple
People educated at Eton College
English cricketers
Buckinghamshire cricketers
Minor Counties cricketers
Oxford University cricketers
Buckinghamshire cricket captains